The 181st Rifle Division was a division of the Red Army, active from 1940 to at least 1945, formed from the remnants of the Latvian Army after the Soviet occupation of Latvia in 1940.

First Formation
It was formed in August–September 1940, after the forced annexation of Latvia to the USSR, based on the Kurzeme and Vidzeme Divisions of the Latvian Army. The division wore the old uniforms of the Latvian Army with Soviet insignia and were also equipped with weaponry of the former army, which made them stand out from other units of the Red Army. It became part of the 24th Rifle Corps. It was stationed in Riga.

It was part of the 'operational army' during World War II from 22 June 1941 to 16 October 1941.

On June 22, 1941, it was stationed at summer camps in the Gulbene area in an abbreviated format. Here until July 29, the division was expanded to full wartime strength.

From the beginning of the war desertion of Latvians began, and from June 29, 1941, according to some sources, they began their demobilization. More precisely, Latvians were simply released from house to house, previously disarmed - all more than 2,000 people (mostly from old time required). The division was completed with personnel of the interior regions of the USSR. The main body (about 30% of the total force) came from the central and southern areas of the current Pskov Oblast. However, the core personnel were Latvian. The combat training level of the Latvian Riflemen was quite high - many of them received awards and honors from the commanders in the war, including for their period of stay in the 181st Division.

The division was wiped out at Staraya Russa in September 1941.

The division was formally disbanded after defeats during Operation Barbarossa on 16 October 1941.

Second Formation
It was briefly recreated at Stalingrad, wiped out at Kalach in August 1942.

Third Formation
Created again at Chelyabinsk from the 10th Rifle Division NKVD in February 1943, fought at Demyansk, Korosten, and in Poland and Germany. Later the division was assigned to the 6th Army of the 1st Ukrainian Front in May 1945.

Organization in 1941 
Organization of the division in 1941:

 Headquarters
 186th Rifle Regiment
 195th Rifle Regiment
 243rd Rifle Regiment
 639th Light Artillery Regiment
 640th Howitzer Artillery Regiment
 16th Anti-Tank Battalion
 186th Anti-Aircraft Battalion
 113th Reconnaissance Battalion
 296th Engineer Battalion
 169th Signal Battalion
 202nd Medical Battalion
 29th Supply Battalion
 257th Chemical Defense Company

Notes

References
Robert G. Poirier and Albert Z. Conner, The Red Army Order of Battle in the Great Patriotic War, Novato: Presidio Press, 1985. . Poirer and Conner primarily used the wartime files of the German Foreign Armies East ('FHO') intelligence section, of which substantial sections are now held by the U.S. National Archives.

External links
 Справочник на сайте клуба «Память» Воронежского госуниверситета
 Перечень № 5 стрелковых, горнострелковых, мотострелковых и моторизованных дивизий, входивших в состав действующей армии в годы Великой Отечественной войны
 Central Archive of the Russian Ministry of Defence (TsAMO RF) 873, 3455.
 В.Терентьев — История 181-й стрелковой дивизии РККА. СПб; Нестор, 2006. 100 с.
 В.Терентьев — Девять дней 1941 года. СПб; Нестор, 2008. 84 с.

181
Military units and formations established in 1940
Military units and formations awarded the Order of the Red Banner